Western District may refer to:

Australia
 Australia Felix
 Western District (Victoria), Australia
 Western District Lakes

Bulgaria
 Western district, Plovdiv

Canada
 Western District, Upper Canada

Hong Kong
 Western District (Hong Kong) or Sai Wan

Malta
 Western District, a district of Malta

Spain
 Western District (General Junta of Asturias constituency)

United Kingdom
 Western District (British Army)

United States
 Western District, American Samoa
 Western District of Kentucky
 Western District of Louisiana
 Western District of Michigan
 Western District of Missouri
 Western District of New York
 Western District of North Carolina
 Western District of Oklahoma
 Western District of Pennsylvania
 Western District of Tennessee
 Western District of Texas
 Western District of Virginia
 Western District of Washington
 Western District, Jackson County, West Virginia
 Western District of Wisconsin
 Western District of Columbia, a proposed district in 19th-century Illinois and Kentucky

Other uses
 Western District of The Wire

See also
 Nishi-ku (disambiguation), western districts (ku) in Japanese cites 
 Seo-gu (disambiguation), western districts (gu) in Korean cites 
 West District (disambiguation)

District name disambiguation pages